The 2015–16 season was the 59th season in RK Zamet’s history. It is their 8th successive season in the Dukat Premier League, and 38nd successive top tier season.

First team squad

Goalkeeper
 1  Marin Đurica
 16  Dino Slavić

Wingers
RW
 6  Dario Černeka
 11  Filip Glavaš
LW
 4  Mateo Hrvatin (vice-captain)
 9  Viktor Stipčić

Line players
 7  Milan Uzelac (captain)
 20  Jadranko Stojanović

Back players
LB
 8  Bojan Lončarić
 15  Petar Jelušić
 23  David Miličević
CB
 14  Matija Golik
 17  Raul Valković
 18  Paulo Grozdek
RB
 5  Marko Mrakovčić
 13  Luka Kovačević

Out on loan
 Korado Juričić (at  Mladi Rudar)

Injured
 Dario Černeka

Technical staff
  President: Vedran Devčić
  Sports director: Vedran Babić
  Head Coach: Marin Mišković 
  Assistant Coach: Valter Matošević
  Goalkeeper Coach: Valter Matošević
  Fitness Coach: Dragan Marijanović
  Tehniko: Williams Černeka

Competitions

Overall

Dukat Premier League

Dukat Premier League

Matches

Play-offs

Matches

Croatian Cup

PGŽ Cup - Qualifier matches

Matches

Friendlies

Pre-season tournaments

Memorial Robert Barbić - Beli

Statistics

Appearances and goals

Source: League Squad

Goalkeepers

Source: League Squad

Transfers

In

Out

External links
Official website of RK Zamet (Croatian)
European record  (English)

References

RK Zamet seasons